Major-General Thomas Anthony Boam CB CBE (born 14 February 1932) was Commander of British Forces in Hong Kong.

Military career
Educated at Bradfield College and the Royal Military Academy Sandhurst, Boam was commissioned into the Scots Guards in 1952. He became commanding officer of the 2nd Battalion Scots Guards and was deployed to Northern Ireland where he was appointed an Officer of the Order of the British Empire for his services there in 1973. He became Commander of the British Army Advisory Team in Nigeria in 1976, Brigadier General Staff at Headquarters UK Land Forces in 1978 and Chief of Staff for British Forces in Hong Kong in 1979. He was appointed Head of the British Defence Staff in Washington, D.C. in 1981 and Commander of British Forces in Hong Kong in 1985. In that capacity hosted a visit by Princess Margaret. He retired in 1987.

He lives in Pulborough in West Sussex.

References

|-

1932 births
British Army major generals
Companions of the Order of the Bath
Commanders of the Order of the British Empire
Scots Guards officers
Living people
British military personnel of The Troubles (Northern Ireland)
People educated at Bradfield College
British military attachés